The Midnight Man is a 2016 American direct-to-video crime thriller film starring 
Will Kemp, Brinna Kelly, William Forsythe, Brent Spiner, Doug Jones, Vinnie Jones, Steve Valentine, Max Adler, and William Miller. Brinna Kelly also produced and co-wrote, along with director D.C. Hamilton. It was released to DVD and digitally by Cinedigm on March 1, 2016.

Plot
When Grady, an assassin with a genetic disorder that renders him unable to feel pain, is sent on a high-stakes assignment, his world is turned upside-down after an attack when he awakens to discover that he can feel pain for the first time in his life. With the clock ticking and his greatest asset gone, Grady will go head-to-head with his greatest fears and unspeakable enemies, while experiencing a tactile world he never could have imagined.

Cast
 Will Kemp as Grady
 Brinna Kelly as Zan
 William Forsythe as Fairbanks
 Brent Spiner as Ezekiel
 Doug Jones as Vick
 Vinnie Jones as Pearl
 Steve Valentine as the Escort
 Max Adler as Simmons
 William Miller as Nomack
 Rich Finley as Riggs

External links
 
 

2016 crime thriller films
2010s crime comedy films
2016 independent films
2010s supernatural films
2016 direct-to-video films
2016 films
American comedy thriller films
American crime thriller films
American crime comedy films
American direct-to-video films
American independent films
American supernatural thriller films
Direct-to-video comedy films
Direct-to-video crime films
Direct-to-video thriller films
Films shot in Los Angeles
2016 comedy films
2010s English-language films
2010s American films